Vien is a surname of French origin, as well as another spelling of the Vietnamese given name Viên (which often finds use alone following a title and thus appearing to English speakers to be a surname).

Those bearing the surname include:

 Joseph-Marie Vien (1716 – 1809), French painter
 Thomas Vien (1881–1972), Canadian politician
 Jacques Vien (born 1932), Canadian politician
 Dominique Vien (born 1967), Canadian politician

Those bearing the given name include:

 Cao Văn Viên (1921–2008), South Vietnamese General
 Linh Quang Viên (1918–2013), South Vietnamese Lieutenant General